Ji Young Chae (born 1993) is a principal dancer with the Boston Ballet.

Biography 
Ji Young Chae trained ballet at Seoul Arts High School and Korea National University of Arts.

Before joining a professional dance company, Young Chae received multiple awards. In 2020, she was awarded the gold medal at the International Ballet Competition in Jackson, Mississippi, as well in Varna, Bulgaria. The following year, she won the gold medal at the International Ballet Competition in Boston, Massachusetts.

In 2011, Young Chae joined the Washington Ballet and performed at the Paris Conservatory Ballet Festival, as well as the International Baltic Ballet Festival Gala.

She then joined the Boston Ballet in 2013, was promoted to soloist in 2015, then promoted to principal dancer in 2018.

References 

 
Living people
1993 births
Boston Ballet principal dancers
Boston Ballet dancers
Korean ballet dancers
Korea National University of Arts alumni
Seoul Arts High School alumni